The Pleasant Hill School at 2722 Farm Rd. 1399 in Linden in Cass County, Texas was a Rosenwald School built in 1925 to serve African-American children.  It has elements of Bungalow/craftsman style.  It was listed on the National Register of Historic Places in 2004.

It is a two-teacher-plan Rosenwald School that cost $3,450 to construct.  Funding was $2,050 from public monies, $700 from the Rosenwald Fund, $700 from Negroes, and $0 from Whites, according to historic records.

It was one of 23 Rosenwald schools in Cass County, of which only it and another in Linden survived in 2003.

See also

National Register of Historic Places listings in Cass County, Texas
Recorded Texas Historic Landmarks in Cass County

References

School buildings on the National Register of Historic Places in Texas
Buildings and structures completed in 1925
Buildings and structures in Cass County, Texas
National Register of Historic Places in Cass County, Texas
Recorded Texas Historic Landmarks
Rosenwald schools